Sinners in Heaven is a 1924 American silent island romantic drama film directed by Alan Crosland and released through Paramount Pictures. It is based on the novel of the same name by Clive Arden and stars Richard Dix and Bebe Daniels in the principal roles.

Cast

Preservation
With no prints of Sinners in Heaven located in any film archives, it is a lost film.

See also
List of lost films

References

External links

Still photo of actress Betty Hilburn from the film
Dix and Daniels, Sinners in Heaven; lobby advertisement

American silent feature films
Films directed by Alan Crosland
Lost American films
Paramount Pictures films
1924 romantic drama films
American romantic drama films
American black-and-white films
1924 lost films
Lost romantic drama films
1920s American films
Silent romantic drama films
Silent American drama films
1920s English-language films